The Mackay Trophy is awarded yearly by the United States Air Force for the "most meritorious flight of the year" by an Air Force person, persons, or organization.  The trophy is housed in the Smithsonian Institution's National Air and Space Museum. The award is administered by the U.S. National Aeronautic Association.

The award was established on 27 January 1911 by Clarence Mackay, who was then head of the Postal Telegraph-Cable Company and the Commercial Cable Company. Originally, aviators could compete for the trophy annually under rules made each year or the War Department could award the trophy for the most meritorious flight of the year.

Awardees
The following is a list of awardees:

1910s

1920s

1930s

1940s

1950s

1960s

1970s

1980s

1990s

2000s

2010s

See also

 List of aviation awards

References

Bibliography
 National Aeronautic Association Mackay Trophy Page
 ASC Award Winners; Mackay Trophy
 Smithsonian Aeronautics Division Awards and Trophies

Awards and decorations of the United States Air Force
Aviation awards